Put It in Your Mouth is the first EP released by emcee Akinyele. Featuring Kia Jeffries, it was released on August 13, 1996, on Zoo Entertainment's sub-label Stress Entertainment and was produced by Chris Forte, Frankie Cutlass, DJ Enuff, Jiv Pos, Dr. Butcher and EZ Elpee. The EP proved to be a success, peaking at No. 127 on the Billboard 200, No. 18 on the Top R&B/Hip-Hop Albums chart and No. 5 on the Top Heatseekers chart. The EP is best known for the title track, which has become Akinyele's best-known song.

Track listing

References

1996 debut EPs
Akinyele (rapper) albums
Bertelsmann Music Group EPs
Volcano Entertainment EPs
Zoo Entertainment (record label) EPs
Dirty rap songs
Dirty rap albums